The 2018 World Series of Poker (WSOP) is the 49th annual tournament, and took place from May 30 to July 17 at the Rio All Suite Hotel and Casino in Las Vegas, Nevada. There was a record 78 bracelet events. The $10,000 No Limit Hold'em Main Event began on July 2 and concluded on July 15.

The Main Event, as well as the Big One for One Drop, were again streamed in their entirety on ESPN and Poker Central.

The 2018 World Series of Poker featured the announced retirement of ten-time bracelet winner and Poker Hall of Fame member Doyle Brunson from tournament poker, an announcement that came after he registered for the $10,000 No Limit 2-7 Lowball Draw Championship (Event 23). Brunson made the final table of the event and finished in sixth place.

Schedule changes
The World Series of Poker introduced the Big Blind Ante to eight events. This format made the big blind pay the ante for the entire table. It was utilized for events 13, 20, 45, 54, 74, 77 and 78.

Event schedule
Source:

Player of the Year
Final standings as of November 2 (end of WSOPE):

Main Event
The $10,000 No Limit Hold'em Main Event began on July 2 with the first of three starting flights. There were then 2 day 2 flights (AB and C) and then 5 more days of play before the final table. The final table began on July 12 and played out over three days, with the winner being determined on July 14.

The Main Event drew 7,874 players, the second-largest field in the tournament's history, generating a prize pool of $74,015,600. The top 1,182 players finished in the money. Each player at the final table earned $1,000,000, with the winner getting $8,800,000.

Performance of past champions

* Indicates the place of a player who finished in the money

Other notable high finishes
NB: This list is restricted to top 30 finishers with an existing Wikipedia entry.

Final Table
2009 World Champion Joe Cada made the final table, finishing 5th, making him the first former champion to do so since Dan Harrington finished 4th in 2004. The board ran out , and Zhu was eliminated in 10th, while Labat was left crippled and Manion was propelled to the chip lead.

Heads up play between Tony Miles and John Cynn lasted for over 10 hours and 199 hands. This set the record for the largest number of hands played heads up during a WSOP Main Event final table. The final table lasted a total of 442 hands. 

*Career statistics prior to the beginning of the 2018 Main Event.

Final Table results

Big One for One Drop
The $1,000,000 Big One for One Drop began on July 15. It is the third time the event was held. Antonio Esfandiari won $18.3 million in the first event in 2012, while Dan Colman was the $15.3 million champion in 2014. Elton Tsang won €11,111,111 in 2016 at Monte-Carlo One Drop Extravaganza in 2016, although since this event was not held at the WSOP, he did not receive a bracelet for it. The One Drop Foundation, founded by Guy Laliberte, received $80,000 from every buy-in. The 2018 event saw 27 players enter, generating a prize pool of $24,840,000. The top five players finished in the money, with the winner getting $10 million. Justin Bonomo won the tournament, and took over from Daniel Negreanu at the top of the all time money list with the victory.

Performance of past champions

Final Table

References

External links
Official site

World Series of Poker
World Series of Poker
World Series of Poker